Virus Tropical is a 2017 Colombian-Ecuadorian traditionally animated coming-of-age film directed by Santiago Caicedo, based on the 2011 semi-autobiographical graphic novel of the same name by cartoonist Power Paola. From a screenplay by Enrique Lozano, Power Paola handled the film's art direction. Produced by Timbo Estudio and Ikki Films, Virus Tropical had its world premiere at the Animation Is Film Festival on 21 October 2017. It was released in Colombian cinemas on 17 May 2018, where it grossed $31,100. The film received generally positive reviews.

Production 
The art direction of Virus Tropical was headed by cartoonist and writer of the titular graphic novel Power Paola. Paola produced around 5,000 individual drawings for the film, which combines 3D animation with hand-drawn animation to create a boldly graphic yet childlike aesthetic to depict the film's tone. Released in black and white, the film explores themes of sexuality, growth and one's relationship with family.

Release 
Virus Tropical had its world premiere at the Animation Is Film Festival on 21 October 2017, and had a limited release to 24 theatres in Colombia on 17 May 2018. It grossed $10,142 during its opening week for a total gross of $31,100 during its entire theatrical run.

Critical reception 
On review aggregator Rotten Tomatoes, Virus Tropical holds an approval rating of 78% based on nine critical reviews, with an average rating of 6.30/10.

References

External links 

2017 animated films
Colombian animated films
Ecuadorian animated films
2010s Spanish-language films